Jesús Martínez Tejeda (born 19 January 1976 in Gómez Palacio, Durango) is a Mexican former professional boxer who competed from 1997 to 2011. He challenged for the WBC flyweight title in 2002. As an amateur, he represented his country at the 1996 Summer Olympics in Atlanta, Georgia. In that competition, he was stopped in the second round of the men's light flyweight division by Indonesia's La Paene Masara.

References

1976 births
Living people
Boxers from Durango
Flyweight boxers
Light-flyweight boxers
Boxers at the 1996 Summer Olympics
Olympic boxers of Mexico
People from Gómez Palacio, Durango
Mexican male boxers